United Nations General Assembly (UNGA) resolution 377 A, the "Uniting for Peace" resolution, states that in any cases where the Security Council, because of a lack of unanimity among its five permanent members (P5), fails to act as required to maintain international security and peace, the General Assembly shall consider the matter immediately and may issue appropriate recommendations to UN members for collective measures, including the use of armed force when necessary, in order to maintain or restore international security and peace. It was adopted 3 November 1950, after fourteen days of Assembly discussions, by a vote of 52 to 5, with 2 abstentions. The resolution was designed to provide the UN with an alternative avenue for action when at least one P5 member uses its veto to obstruct the Security Council from carrying out its functions mandated by the UN Charter.

To facilitate prompt action by the General Assembly in the case of a deadlocked Security Council, the resolution created the mechanism of the emergency special session (ESS). Emergency special sessions have been convened under this procedure on eleven occasions, with the most recent convened in February 2022, to address Russia's invasion of Ukraine. However, unlike the preceding ESSs, the tenth ESS has been 'adjourned' and 'resumed' on numerous occasions over the past several years, and remains adjourned. Indeed, more than ten separate 'meetings' have been held by the Assembly, whilst sitting in the tenth ESS, since 2000.

Text of the General Assembly resolution

Origins 

The Uniting for Peace resolution was initiated by the United States, and submitted by the "Joint Seven-Powers" in October 1950, as a means of circumventing further Soviet vetoes during the course of the Korean War (25 June 1950 – 27 July 1953). It was adopted by 52 votes to 5, with 2 abstentions.

In the closing days of Assembly discussions leading up to the adoption of 377 A, US delegate to the UN, John Foster Dulles, made specific reference to the Korean War as a chief motivator in the passage of the resolution:

Then came the armed attack on the Republic of Korea and it seemed that the pattern of 1931 had in fact begun to repeat itself and that the third world war might be in the making. And that might have been—and I think it would have been—had it not been for a series of accidental circumstances which made it possible to improvise collective resistance to that aggression.

The principal accidental circumstance referred to by Dulles was that the Soviet Union was boycotting the Security Council at the time of the outbreak of hostilities in Korea, and had been since January 1950, owing to its discontent over the UN's refusal to recognize the People's Republic of China's representatives as the legitimate representatives of China, returning only on 1 August 1950 to assume the rotating role of Council President, for that month. This circumstance had meant that the Security Council was able to adopt its resolutions 83, of 27 June 1950, and 84, of 7 July 1950, thereby establishing a UN-mandated force for South Korea "to repel the armed attack" from the North. Had the Soviet Union been seated at the Council during the months of June and July, the relevant draft resolutions would almost certainly have been vetoed, and the United States was well aware of this, as evidenced by the above statement.

Assembly discussions on the "Joint Seven-Power draft resolution" 

Some of the key statements made during Assembly discussions on 377 A, whilst sitting in plenary, include:

United States (John Foster Dulles)

United Kingdom (Kenneth Gilmour Younger)

France (Jean Chauvel)

Soviet Union (Andrey Vyshinsky)

Invocation of General Assembly   377 
The Uniting for Peace resolution was implemented 13 times between 1951 and 2022. It has been invoked by both the Security Council (8 times) and the General Assembly (5 times). Eleven of those cases took the form of Emergency Special Sessions.

Security Council invoked

Middle East (1956) – France and UK veto – 1st Emergency Special Session 
Invoked by Security Council Resolution 119. Although "Uniting for Peace" was enacted because of Soviet vetoes, its first use was against two NATO members. The Assembly's first emergency special session was instigated by a procedural vote of the Security Council on its Resolution 119 of 31 October 1956, as a result of the Suez Crisis, which commenced 29 October 1956. France and the United Kingdom were the only two Council members to vote against the adoption of Council resolution 119, and were likewise, along with Israel, the principal antagonists in the conflict with Egypt. The session's meetings were held between 1 November and 10 November 1956.

On 7 November 1956, the Assembly adopted resolution 1001, thereby establishing the United Nations Emergency Force I (UNEF I) to "secure and supervise the cessation of hostilities". The Assembly, by its own resolutions, not only established UNEF I, but also called for "an immediate cease-fire", and recommended "that all Member States refrain from introducing military goods in the area", thereby authorizing military sanctions.

Hungary (1956) – USSR veto – 2nd Emergency Special Session 

Invoked by Security Council Resolution 120. Second UNGA Emergency Special Session on "The Situation in Hungary" adopted five resolutions, including Resolution 1004 (ES-II) mandating a commission of inquiry into foreign intervention in Hungary.

Middle East (1958) – USSR veto – 3rd Emergency Special Session 
Invoked by Security Council Resolution 129. Third UNGA Emergency Special Session on "The Situation in the Middle East" adopted Resolution 1237 (ES-III) calling for early withdrawal of foreign troops from Jordan and Lebanon.

Congo (1960) – USSR veto – 4th Emergency Special Session 

Invoked by Security Council Resolution 157. UNGA Fourth Emergency Special Session on the "Congo Situation" adopted Resolution 1474/Rev. 1/(ES-IV) requesting Secretary-General to continue to take vigorous action in accordance with Security Council resolutions and appealing to all Members for urgent voluntary contributions to a UN Fund for the Congo and to refrain from sending military assistance except through the UN.

Bangladesh (1971) – USSR veto – Resolved without Special Session 

Invoked by Security Council Resolution 303. The Twenty-Sixth Regular Session was seated no Emergency Special Session was needed so the issue was handled under the agenda item "UN Assistance to East Pakistan Refugees".

Afghanistan (1980) – USSR veto – 6th Emergency Special Session 

Invoked by Security Council Resolution 462. Sixth Emergency Special Session on "The Situation in Afghanistan" adopted Resolution ES-6/2 calling for the immediate, unconditional and total withdrawal of foreign troops from Afghanistan.

Middle East (1982) – US veto – 9th Emergency Special Session 
Invoked by Security Council Resolution 500. Ninth Emergency Special Session on "The Situation in the Middle East" adopted Resolution ES-9/1 declaring Israel a non-peace-loving state and calling on members to apply a number of measures on Israel.

Ukraine (2022) – Russia veto – 11th Emergency Special Session 

Invoked by Security Council Resolution 2623. Eleventh Emergency Special Session on "The Situation in Ukraine" met on 28th February 2022.

General Assembly invoked

Korea (1951) – USSR veto 

Following three vetoes by the USSR on the situation in Korea, six Security Council members requested the General Assembly to consider the situation (A/1618). The Security Council subsequently removed the item from its agenda, enabling the General Assembly to freely discuss the matter under Article 11 of the UN Charter. In resolution 498(V), the Assembly used the language of the Uniting for Peace resolution: "noting that the Security Council, because of lack of unanimity of the permanent members, has failed to exercise its primary responsibility for the maintenance of international peace and security with regard to Chinese communist intervention in Korea ..."

Middle East (1967) – USSR failed to obtain 9 votes – 5th Emergency Special Session 

Invoked by General Assembly at the request of USSR (A/6717) and vote (98-3-3). Fifth Emergency Special Session on "The Situation in the Middle East" adopted six resolutions, including Resolutions 2253 and 2254 (ES-V) calling on Israel to rescind unilateral measures in Jerusalem.

Palestine (1980) – US veto – 7th Emergency Special Session 
Invoked by General Assembly request Senegal (A/ES-7/1). Seventh Emergency Special Session on "The Question of Palestine" adopted eight resolutions (ES-7/2 through ES-7/9) calling for the unconditional and total withdrawal of Israel from territories occupied since 1967.

Namibia (1981) – France, UK and US veto – 8th Emergency Special Session 

Invoked by General Assembly at the request of Zimbabwe (A/ES-8/1). The UNGA's eighth emergency special session was convened by Zimbabwe in order to discuss the "Question of Namibia". Its meetings were conducted between 3 September and 14 September 1981.

At the conclusion of the final meeting of the session, the Assembly adopted resolution A/RES/ES-8/2:

This was the first occasion on which the Assembly authorized economic, diplomatic and cultural sanctions against a state; it had already authorized military sanctions by its resolution 1001 of 7 November 1956, during its first emergency special session. Resolution A/RES/ES-8/2 also reaffirmed the power of the General Assembly to authorize the use of military force by UN Member States.

Palestine (1997) – US veto – 10th Emergency Special Session 
Invoked by General Assembly request of Qatar (A/ES/10/1). Tenth Emergency Special Session on "The Question of Palestine", still in session, adopted inter alia, Resolution ES-10/14 requesting an advisory opinion from the International Court of Justice.
For more information see Tenth Emergency Special Session of the United Nations General Assembly

Uniting for Peace and the Security Council 'veto power' 

It has been argued that with the adoption of the 'Uniting for Peace' resolution by the General Assembly, and given the interpretations of the Assembly's powers that became customary international law as a result, the Security Council 'power of veto' problem could be surmounted. By adopting A/RES/377 A, on 3 November 1950, over two-thirds of UN Member states declared that, according to the UN Charter, the permanent members of the UNSC cannot and should not prevent the UNGA from taking any and all action necessary to restore international peace and security, in cases where the UNSC has failed to exercise its 'primary responsibility' for maintaining peace. Such an interpretation sees the UNGA as being awarded 'final responsibility'—rather than 'secondary responsibility'—for matters of international peace and security, by the UN Charter. Various official and semi-official UN reports make explicit reference to the Uniting for Peace resolution as providing a mechanism for the UNGA to overrule any UNSC vetoes.

Treatment of the Uniting for Peace resolution by the International Court of Justice 
ICJ, Certain Expenses of the United  Nations (Article 17, paragraph 2, of the Charter), Advisory Opinion of 20 July  1962, ICJ Reports 1962, p. 151.
ICJ, Legal Consequences for States of  the Continued Presence of South Africa in Namibia (South West Africa)  notwithstanding Security Council Resolution 276 (1970), Advisory Opinion, ICJ Reports 1971, p. 16.
ICJ, Legal Consequences of the  Construction of a Wall in the Occupied Palestinian Territory, Advisory Opinion, ICJ Reports 2004,  p. 136.

Notes

References 
 UN General Assembly Emergency Special Sessions. UN.org
 UN General Assembly resolutions of the Fifth Regular Session (1950). UN.org
 UN General Assembly Landmark Documents. UN.org
 UN Security Council resolutions of 1956. UN.org

Further reading 
 J. Andrassy, “Uniting  for Peace”, American Journal of  International Law, vol. 50 (1956) 563-582.
R. Barber, "Uniting for Peace Not Aggression: Responding to Chemical Weapons in Syria Without Breaking the Law", J Conflict Security Law (2019) 24(1), 71-110.
A.J. Carswell, 'Unblocking the UN Security Council: The Uniting for Peace Resolution', J Conflict Security Law (Winter 2013) 18 (3), 453-480.
J. Krasno and M. Das, “The  Uniting for Peace Resolution and Other Ways of Circumventing the Authority of  the Security Council”, in: B. Cronin and I. Hurd (eds.), The UN Security Council and the Politics of International Authority,  London et al.:  Routledge, 2008, 173-195.
K. S. Petersen, “The  Uses of the Uniting for Peace Resolution since 1950”, International Organization, vol. 13 (1959) 219-232.
M. Ramsden, "'Uniting for Peace' and Humanitarian Intervention: The Authorising Function of the U.N. General Assembly, Washington International Law Journal, vol. 25 (2016), 267-304.
H. Reicher, “The Uniting  for Peace Resolution on the Thirtieth Anniversary of its Passage”, Columbia Journal of Transnational Law, vol. 20 (1982)  1-49.
E. Stein and R. Morrissey,  “Uniting for Peace Resolution”, in: Encyclopedia  of Public International Law, vol. 4, Amsterdam et al.: Elsevier, 2000,  1232-1235.
Christian Tomuschat, Introductory note, procedural history note and audiovisual material on General Assembly resolution 377 (V) of 3 November 1950 (Uniting for Peace) in the Historic Archives of the United Nations Audiovisual Library of International Law
(hardback);  (paperback). US edition.

0377
Veto Power
Suez Crisis
Arab–Israeli conflict
Egypt
Egypt
1950 in law
1950 in the United Nations
International law
Korean War